Maccabi Bnei Nahf F.C. is an Israeli football club based in Nahf. The club currently plays in Liga Bet North A division.

History
The club was founded in 2005 and played in Liga Gimel until the club was promoted to Liga Bet at the end of the 2014–15 season. At the same season, the club won its divisional cup and advanced to the 6th round of the State Cup, where the club met Maccabi Tzur Shalom, but lost 0–1

Honours

Cups

References

External links
Maccabi Bnei Nahf The Israel Football Association 

Nahf
Association football clubs established in 2005
2005 establishments in Israel
Maccabi football clubs